Spotted Horse and Spotted Horses may refer to:

Spotted Horse, Wyoming, an unincorporated community in Campbell County
Spotted Horses, a novella written by William Faulkner

See also
Big Spotted Horse
Leopard Spotted Horses
List of horse breeds
Spotted Saddle horse